Nisus Writer, originally Nisus, is a word processing program for the Apple Macintosh. The program is available in two varieties: Nisus Writer Express, and Nisus Writer Pro.

The program is valued by its users—especially book authors—for its reliability and unique features.

History
First introduced in 1989, the Nisus Writer was the first word processor for Macintosh able to handle multiple type systems within one document, e.g. Arabic, Hebrew, Japanese, etc., thanks to WorldScript. Therefore, Nisus Writer was an indispensable tool for people who had to integrate passages written in non-Roman script into a regular document, for instance theologians and archaeologists. Other distinguishing features of the program were non-contiguous text selection, multiple editable clipboards, one of the earliest implementations of multiple undo, voice recording, and inline annotations. It also offers grep search and replace accessed through a graphical dialog box instead of command line options. These features, which were more advanced than those typically found in word processors of the day, were also present in Nisus' QUED/M text editor.

An unusual feature of the Nisus file format was that all font and formatting information was saved in the file's resource fork, with the data fork containing only plain text. Thus, if the file were to be opened in another program on the Mac, or on a Windows PC, the text would be readable (although style information would be lost). This predates cross-platform file formats as used by word processors like Microsoft Word. Contemporary editions of Word had different formats between the Mac and Windows versions and required a translator if the file were to be readable at all. The technique of using the resource fork to store style information was later implemented by Apple Inc. for the standard Macintosh styled text format as used in SimpleText.

Nisus Writer 6.5 is the last classic version of Nisus and is no longer available for purchase. It runs under Mac OS 9.2.2 and PowerPC-based Mac OS X, but only in the Classic environment.

Rather than porting Nisus Writer to Mac OS X Nisus released a fundamentally new product called Nisus Writer Express. It is based on Cocoa and complies with Apple's Mac OS X user interface guidelines. It was originally developed as Okito Composer by Charles Jolley (now of Sprout Systems). Nisus bought Okito Composer and hired Charles as Managing Director in which capacity he oversaw further development of the word processor he had created. Jolley later left Nisus to work for Apple.

Nisus Compact was an extra-lean variant marketed for Apple's 68K PowerBooks. It was designed to fit entirely within RAM to avoid accessing the hard disk and thereby draining the laptop's battery. It was at first a commercial product but was later given away as a freemium with various books and magazines as part of a marketing campaign. "Upgrades" to Nisus Writer were offered at a discount.

Current product range
As of November 2017, Nisus sells two versions of its word processor: Nisus Writer Express and Nisus Writer Pro. Both versions come with more than adequate functionality for most users, although Pro leans more towards business documents, and is designed as a replacement for the likes of Microsoft Word for Macintosh. The Pro version supports more file formats.

See also
List of word processors
Comparison of word processors
OpenDocument software
Office Open XML software
MathMagic, an equation editor compatible with Nisus Writer, supporting automatic baseline alignment

References

External links
Nisus website
The Nisus Way

Classic Mac OS word processors
MacOS word processors
MacOS-only software